Nepal Art Council is a non-profit organization established in 1962 (2019 BS) to promote the art and the artist of Nepal. It operates an art gallery located at Baber Mahal, Kathmandu,  with an area of about 29,400 sq. ft.

History 
King Mahendra had appointed the then Prime Minister Kirti Nidhi Bista as the founding President, Lain Singh Bangdel as the General Secretary and Mrigendra SJB Rana as the treasurer. It was conceived as a Public-Private partnership organisation. The current building was constructed in 1991 and was designed by Shankar Nath Rimal.

See also 

 National Museum of Nepal
 Nepal Academy of Fine Arts

External links
Official website

References

Arts in Nepal
Arts organizations
Organisations based in Nepal
1962 establishments in Nepal
Art museums and galleries in Nepal